Smithland is an unincorporated community in Hendricks Township, Shelby County, in the U.S. state of Indiana.

History
Smithland was platted in 1851 by Hezekiah Smith, and named for him.

A post office was established at Smithland in 1853, and remained in operation until it was discontinued in 1901.

Geography

References

Unincorporated communities in Shelby County, Indiana
Unincorporated communities in Indiana
Indianapolis metropolitan area